Martin Damm and Cyril Suk, the two-time defending champions, successfully defended their title, by defeating Lars Burgsmüller and Daniel Vacek 6–3, 6–7(7–9), 6–3 in the final.

Seeds

Draw

Draw

References

External links
 Official results archive (ATP)
 Official results archive (ITF)

Rosmalen Grass Court Championships
2004 ATP Tour